Valery Arshba (born 4 October 1949 in Tkvarcheli) was the first Vice President of the Republic of Abkhazia. He was first elected to the office on 5 January 1995, under President Vladislav Ardzinba, and the pair was re-elected in the 1999 Presidential election where they ran unopposed. Arshba initially was a candidate in the October 2004 Abkhazian presidential election, but he withdrew just before the start of the campaign period due to pressure from his family. During the post-election crisis that followed, Arshba supported opposition candidate Sergei Bagapsh, and when the latter eventually became President following a power-sharing agreement with his rival Raul Khajimba and new elections in January 2005, Valery Arshba was made head of the presidential administration of Abkhazia on 15 February 2005.

References 

1949 births
Living people
People from Tkvarcheli District
Vice presidents of Abkhazia
Heads of the Presidential Administration of Abkhazia
Vice-presidential candidates in the 1994 Abkhazian presidential election
Vice-presidential candidates in the 1999 Abkhazian presidential election
Candidates in the 2004 Abkhazian presidential election